Jason Thomas Kabia (born 26 May 1969) is an English former professional footballer who played as a striker.

Career
Born in Sutton-in-Ashfield, Kabia played non-league football with Oakham United, before spending two seasons in the Football League with Lincoln City, making a total of 28 league appearances. While at Lincoln, Kabia also spent a loan spell at Doncaster Rovers, making five league appearances. Kabia later played in Malta for Valletta, in English non-league football for Gainsborough Trinity, and in the Republic of Ireland for a number of clubs including Cork City, Galway United, Waterford United, Kilkenny City. In July 2001 he moved to Cobh Ramblers.

Personal life
He is the father of Jaze Kabia, who is also a professional footballer, currently playing for Scottish Premiership side Livingston.

References

1968 births
Living people
English footballers
Gainsborough Trinity F.C. players
Lincoln City F.C. players
Doncaster Rovers F.C. players
Valletta F.C. players
Cork City F.C. players
Galway United F.C. (1937–2011) players
Waterford F.C. players
Kilkenny City A.F.C. players
Cobh Ramblers F.C. players
English Football League players
Oakham United F.C. (Nottinghamshire) players
Association football forwards
English expatriate footballers
English expatriates in Malta
Expatriate footballers in Malta
English expatriates in Ireland
Expatriate association footballers in the Republic of Ireland